Dioctyl adipate (DOA) is an organic compound with the formula (CH2CH2CO2C8H17)2.  It is a colorless oily liquid.  As well as related diesters derived from 2-ethylhexanol, decanol, isodecanol, etc., it is used as a plasticizer.

DEHA is sometimes incorrectly called dioctyl adipate.

Toxicity
Esters of adipic acid exhibit low acute toxicities in animal models. The LD50 of the related ethylhexanoate is estimated at 900 mg/kg (rat, i.v.).

References

Adipate esters
Plasticizers
IARC Group 3 carcinogens